Yurinsky District (Jürnÿ kymdem; , Jürnö kundem) is an administrative and municipal district (raion), one of the fourteen in the Mari El Republic, Russia. It is located in the west of the republic. Its administrative center is the urban locality (an urban-type settlement) of Yurino. As of the 2010 Census, the total population of the district was 8,758, with the population of Yurino accounting for 39.6% of that number.

Administrative and municipal status
Within the framework of administrative divisions, Yurinsky District is one of the fourteen in the republic. It is divided into one urban-type settlement (an administrative division with the administrative center in the urban-type settlement (inhabited locality) of Yurino) and five rural okrugs, all of which comprise forty-two rural localities. As a municipal division, the district is incorporated as Yurinsky Municipal District. Yurino Urban-Type Settlement is incorporated into an urban settlement, and the five rural okrugs are incorporated into five rural settlements within the municipal district. The urban-type settlement of Yurino serves as the administrative center of both the administrative and municipal district.

References

Notes

Sources



 
Districts of Mari El